SH4 or SH-4 may refer to:
 State Highway 4, see List of highways numbered 4, a common highway name in many countries
 SH-4 microprocessor architecture
 Silent Hill 4: The Room, the fourth installment in the Silent Hill video game series
 Silent Hunter 4: Wolves of the Pacific, the fourth installment in the Silent Hunter video game series
 sh4, gene controlling shattering in the Poaceae, selected against in the domestication syndrome and selected for in the agricultural weed syndrome